Pellacalyx yunnanensis is a species of plant in the Rhizophoraceae family. It is endemic to China.

References

Rhizophoraceae
Flora of China
Endangered plants
Taxonomy articles created by Polbot